Villa Quintana is a Philippine television drama romance series broadcast by GMA Network. Directed by Gil Tejada Jr., it stars Donna Cruz and Keempee de Leon. It premiered on November 6, 1995. The series concluded on January 24, 1997 with a total of 318 episodes. It was replaced by  Pobre niña rica in its timeslot.

A remake aired from November 4, 2013 to June 6, 2014.

Cast and characters
Lead cast
 Donna Cruz as Lynette Quintana
 Keempee de Leon as Isagani Samonte

Supporting cast
 Tony Mabesa as Manolo Quintana
 Joel Torre as Robert Quintana
 Chanda Romero as Lumeng Samonte
 Pen Medina as Felix Samonte
 Isabel Rivas as Stella Quintana
 Isabel Granada as Rochelle Quintana
 Lander Vera Perez as Jason Quintana
 Jessa Zaragoza as Patrice
 Richard De Dios as Paking
 Timmy Cruz as Elena Malvar
 Mia Gutierrez as Amparing
 Philip Lazaro as Danica
 Fame delos Santos as Leny
 Carmen Enriquez as Guada
 Archie Adamos as Gaston
 Mel Kimura as Ditas
 Onemig Bondoc as Alfon
 Naty Santiago as Syon

Accolades

References

External links
 

1995 Philippine television series debuts
1997 Philippine television series endings
Filipino-language television shows
GMA Network drama series
Philippine romance television series
Television series by Viva Television
Television shows set in the Philippines